Gertrud Wolle (11 March 1891 – 6 July 1952) was a German film actress.

Selected filmography

 Die Insel der Glücklichen (1919)
 Prince Cuckoo (1919)
 Roswolsky's Mistress (1921)
 A Glass of Water (1923)
 Burglars (1930)
 The Three from the Filling Station (1930)
 Bombs on Monte Carlo (1931)
 The Spanish Fly (1931)
 The Private Secretary (1931)
 The Little Escapade (1931)
 The True Jacob (1931)
 Two Hearts Beat as One (1932)
 When Love Sets the Fashion (1932)
 Things Are Getting Better Already (1932)
 Girls to Marry (1932)
 The Beautiful Adventure (1932)
 The Importance of Being Earnest (1932)
 Viktor und Viktoria (1933)
 And Who Is Kissing Me? (1933)
 Tell Me Who You Are (1933)
 The English Marriage (1934)
 Enjoy Yourselves (1934)
 Music in the Blood (1934)
 Decoy (1934)
 A Night of Change (1935)
 The Higher Command (1935)
 Black Roses (1935)
 Das Einmaleins der Liebe (1935)
 The King's Prisoner (1935)
 City of Anatol (1936)
 The Girl Irene (1936)
 The Hound of the Baskervilles (1937)
 Dangerous Game (1937)
 The Unexcused Hour (1937)
 His Best Friend (1937)
 Anton the Last (1939)
 Robert Koch (1939)
 Love is Duty Free (1941)
 Beloved Darling (1943)
 Mask in Blue (1943)
 Why Are You Lying, Elisabeth? (1944)
 Nothing But Coincidence (1949)
 The Cuckoos (1949)
 Two Times Lotte (1950)
 Royal Children (1950)
 Kissing Is No Sin (1950)
 Doctor Praetorius (1950)
 Sensation in San Remo (1951)
 The Lady in Black (1951)
 Nights on the Road (1952)
 The Imaginary Invalid (1952)
 The Devil Makes Three (1953)

References

External links
 

1891 births
1952 deaths
German stage actresses
German film actresses
German silent film actresses
People from Thann, Haut-Rhin
20th-century German actresses